Pachyosa cervinopicta is a species of beetle in the family Cerambycidae. It was described by Léon Fairmaire in 1897. It is known from Japan.

References

Mesosini
Beetles described in 1897